The Portuguese Volleyball Second Division  is the second-level men’s Volleyball League in Portugal, which is also called (Portuguese: "2a Divisão de Voleibol").

The competition is organized by the Federação Portuguesa de Voleibol.

Portuguese 2nd Division Champions

References

Second Division, Portuguese Volleyball